Heidi Zeller-Bähler (born 25 July 1967) is a former Swiss alpine skier.

External links
 

1967 births
Living people
Swiss female alpine skiers
Olympic alpine skiers of Switzerland
Alpine skiers at the 1992 Winter Olympics
Alpine skiers at the 1994 Winter Olympics
20th-century Swiss women
Place of birth missing (living people)